Julie Kim Sinmon (born March 10, 1998) is a Brazilian artistic gymnast. She competed at the 2015 Pan American Games earning the bronze medal in the team all-around event.

References 

Living people
1998 births
Brazilian female artistic gymnasts
Gymnasts at the 2015 Pan American Games
Pan American Games bronze medalists for Brazil
Pan American Games medalists in gymnastics
South American Games gold medalists for Brazil
South American Games bronze medalists for Brazil
South American Games medalists in gymnastics
Competitors at the 2014 South American Games
Medalists at the 2015 Pan American Games
Sportspeople from São Paulo
21st-century Brazilian women
20th-century Brazilian women